Düzova can refer to:

 Düzova, Çınar
 the Turkish name for Exometochi